Greatest Hits is the first compilation album by American country music artist Lee Ann Womack. It features eleven of her biggest hits from her first four albums, a reworking of previous album track ("Does My Ring Burn Your Finger", originally from I Hope You Dance) and two new tracks: "The Wrong Girl" and "Time for Me to Go", the former of which was a top 30 hit for her in 2004, reaching #24. Also included is "Mendocino County Line", originally found on Willie Nelson's 2002 album The Great Divide but not previously included on any of Womack's albums.

In 2005, the album was reissued as a DualDisc, featuring a bonus DVD, and as a hybrid SACD.

Track listing

Charts

Weekly charts

Year-end charts

References

External links
[ Greatest Hits (Dualdisc)] at Allmusic

2004 greatest hits albums
Lee Ann Womack albums
MCA Records compilation albums